Ranqueles gounellei is a species of beetle in the family Cerambycidae. It was described by Bosq in 1947. It is known from northern central Argentina and Bolivia. It feeds on Acacia aroma, Prosopis chilensis, and Prosopis juliflora.

References

Bothriospilini
Beetles described in 1947
Beetles of South America